Quœux-Haut-Maînil is a commune in the Pas-de-Calais department in the Hauts-de-France region of France.

Geography

Population

Places of interest
 The unusually large church of St.Jacques, dating from the fifteenth century.
 The church of St. Thomas.
 Traces of an old castle.

See also
Communes of the Pas-de-Calais department

References

Quoeuxhautmainil